Motegi (written: 茂木) is a Japanese surname. Notable people with the surname include:

, Japanese sport wrestler
, Japanese professional wrestler
, Japanese footballer
, Japanese footballer
, Japanese politician
, Japanese long-distance runner

Japanese-language surnames